This is a list of community colleges or current baccalaureate-granting institutions which used to be known as community colleges, junior colleges, or technical colleges.

Barbados
 Barbados Community College

British Virgin Islands
 H. Lavity Stoutt Community College, Tortola

Malaysia

Johor
 Bandar Penawar Community College, Bandar Penawar
 Branch campus, Bandar Tenggara
 Ledang Community College, Tangkak
 Pasir Gudang Community College, Pasir Gudang
 Branch campus, Tanjung Piai, Pontian
 Segamat Community College, Segamat
 Segamat 2 Community College, Batu Aman

Kedah
 Bandar Darulaman Community College, Jitra
 Kulim Community College, Kulim
 Langkawi Community College, Langkawi
 Sungai Petani Community College, Sungai Petani

Malacca
 Bukit Beruang Community College, Bukit Beruang
 Jasin Community College, Jasin
 Masjid Tanah Community College, Masjid Tanah
 Selandar Community College, Selandar

Negeri Sembilan
 Jelebu Community College, Kuala Klawang
 Jempol Community College, Bahau

Pahang
 Bentong Community College, Karak
 Kuantan Community College, Kuantan
 Mentakab Community College, Temerloh
 Paya Besar Community College, Gambang
 Raub Community College, Raub
 Rompin Community College, Kuala Rompin

Penang
 Bayan Baru Community College, Air Itam
 Bukit Mertajam Community College, Tanah Liat
 Kepala Batas Community College, Kepala Batas
 Nibong Tebal Community College, Simpang Ampat
 Seberang Jaya Community College, Seberang Jaya
 Tasek Gelugor Community College, Teluk Air Tawar

Perak
 Chenderoh Community College, Kuala Kangsar
 Grik Community College, Gerik
 Pasir Salak Community College, Kampung Gajah
 Sungai Siput Community College, Sungai Siput
 Taiping Community College, Kamunting
 Teluk Intan Community College, Seri Manjung

Perlis
 Arau Community College, Arau

Sabah
 Semporna Community College, Semporna
 Tawau Community College, Tawau

Sarawak
 Kuching Community College, Kuching

Selangor
 Hulu Langat Community College, Kajang
 Hulu Selangor Community College, Batang Kali
 Kuala Langat Community College, Kuala Langat
 Sabak Bernam Community College, Sabak Bernam
 Selayang Community College, Batu Caves

Terengganu
 Kuala Terengganu Community College, Kuala Terengganu

Montserrat
 Montserrat Community College (some associate's degrees)

United States

Alabama

 Bevill State Community College
 Bishop State Community College
 Calhoun Community College
 Central Alabama Community College
 Chattahoochee Valley Community College
 Coastal Alabama Community College
 Community College of the Air Force
 Enterprise State Community College
 Gadsden State Community College
 H. Councill Trenholm State Community College
 J.F. Drake State Community and Technical College
 J. F. Ingram State Technical College
 Jefferson State Community College
 Lawson State Community College
 Lurleen B. Wallace Community College
 Marion Military Institute
 Northeast Alabama Community College
 Northwest–Shoals Community College
 Reid State Technical College
 Shelton State Community College
 Snead State Community College
 Southern Union State Community College
 Wallace Community College
 Wallace Community College Selma
 Wallace State Community College

Alaska 
 Iḷisaġvik College
 University of Alaska Anchorage has five community college campuses, including:
 Kenai Peninsula College
 Kodiak College
 Matanuska–Susitna College
 Prince William Sound College
 University of Alaska Fairbanks has four community college campuses
 UAF Community and Technical College
 University of Alaska Southeast has two community college campuses

American Samoa 
 American Samoa Community College

Arizona 
 Arizona Western College
 Central Arizona College
 Cochise College
 Coconino County Community College
 Diné College
 Eastern Arizona College
 Gila Community College District
 Gila Community College
 Maricopa County Community College District
 Chandler–Gilbert Community College
 Estrella Mountain Community College
 GateWay Community College
 Glendale Community College
 Mesa Community College
 Paradise Valley Community College
 Phoenix College
 Rio Salado College
 Scottsdale Community College
 South Mountain Community College
 Mohave Community College
 Northland Pioneer College
 Pima Community College
 Tohono Oʼodham Community College
 Yavapai College

Arkansas 

 Arkansas Northeastern College
 Arkansas State University-Beebe
 Arkansas State University Mid-South
 Arkansas State University–Mountain Home
 Arkansas State University-Newport
 Arkansas State University Three Rivers
 Black River Technical College
 East Arkansas Community College
 National Park College
 North Arkansas College
 Northwest Arkansas Community College
 Ozarka College
 Pulaski Technical College
 South Arkansas Community College
 Southeast Arkansas College
 Southern Arkansas University Tech
 The University of Arkansas System
 Cossatot Community College
 Phillips Community College
 UACC Batesville
 University of Arkansas Hope-Texarkana
 UACC Morrilton
 University of Arkansas Rich Mountain

California

Colorado 

 Aims Community College
 Arapahoe Community College
 Colorado Community Colleges Online
 Colorado Mountain College
 Colorado Northwestern Community College
 Community College of Aurora
 Community College of Denver
 Front Range Community College
 Lamar Community College
 Morgan Community College
 Northeastern Junior College
 Otero College
 Pikes Peak State College
 Pueblo Community College
 Red Rocks Community College
 Trinidad State College
 Western Colorado Community College

Connecticut 

 Asnuntuck Community College
 Capital Community College
 Gateway Community College
 Housatonic Community College
 Manchester Community College
 Middlesex Community College
 Naugatuck Valley Community College
 Northwestern Connecticut Community College
 Norwalk Community College
 Quinebaug Valley Community College
 Three Rivers Community College
 Tunxis Community College

Delaware 

 Delaware Technical Community College

Florida 

 Broward College
 Chipola College
 College of Central Florida
 The College of the Florida Keys
 Daytona State College
 Eastern Florida State College
 Florida Gateway College
 Florida SouthWestern State College
 Florida State College at Jacksonville
 Gulf Coast State College
 Hillsborough Community College
 Indian River State College
 Lake–Sumter State College
 Miami Dade College
 North Florida College
 Northwest Florida State College
 Palm Beach State College
 Pasco–Hernando State College
 Pensacola State College
 Polk State College
 St. Johns River State College
 St. Petersburg College
 Santa Fe College
 Seminole State College of Florida
 South Florida State College
 State College of Florida, Manatee–Sarasota
 Tallahassee Community College
 Valencia College

Georgia 

 Technical College System of Georgia
 Albany Technical College
 Altamaha Technical College
 Athens Technical College
 Atlanta Technical College
 Augusta Technical College
 Central Georgia Technical College
 Chattahoochee Technical College
 Coastal Pines Technical College
 Columbus Technical College
 Georgia Northwestern Technical College
 Georgia Piedmont Technical College
 Gwinnett Technical College
 Lanier Technical College
 Moultrie Technical College
 North Georgia Technical College
 Oconee Fall Line Technical College
 Ogeechee Technical College
 Savannah Technical College
 South Georgia Technical College
 Southeastern Technical College
 Southern Crescent Technical College
 Southern Regional Technical College
 West Georgia Technical College
 Wiregrass Georgia Technical College

Guam 
 Guam Community College

Hawaii 

 University of Hawaii
 Hawaiʻi Community College
 Honolulu Community College
 Kapiʻolani Community College
 Kauaʻi Community College
 Leeward Community College
 University of Hawaiʻi Maui College
 Windward Community College

Idaho 

 College of Southern Idaho
 College of Western Idaho
 College of Eastern Idaho
 North Idaho College

Illinois 

Community college district numbers are given for each district.  Some colleges were established by school districts prior to being organized as college districts.

 Black Hawk College (No. 503)
 Carl Sandburg College (No. 518)
 City Colleges of Chicago (No. 508)
 Harold Washington College
 Kennedy–King College
 Malcolm X College
 Olive–Harvey College
 Richard J. Daley College
 Truman College
 Wilbur Wright College
 College of DuPage (No. 502)
 College of Lake County (No. 532)
 Danville Area Community College (No. 507)
 East St. Louis Community College Center (not independent)
 Metropolitan Community College (No. 541) (1996–1998)
 State Community College of East Saint Louis (No. 601) (1969–1996)
 Elgin Community College (No. 509)
 Harper College (No. 512)
 Heartland Community College (No. 540)
 Highland Community College (No. 519)
 Illinois Central College (No. 514)
 Illinois Eastern Community Colleges (No. 529)
 Frontier Community College
 Lincoln Trail College
 Olney Central College
 Wabash Valley College
 Illinois Valley Community College (No. 513)
 John A. Logan College (No. 530)
 John Wood Community College (No. 539)
 Joliet Junior College (No. 525)
 Kankakee Community College (No. 520)
 Kaskaskia College (No. 501)
 Kishwaukee College (No. 523)
 Lake Land College (No. 517)
 Lewis and Clark Community College (No. 536)
 Lincoln Land Community College (No. 526)
 McHenry County College (No. 528)
 Moraine Valley Community College (No. 524)
 Morton College (No. 527)
 Oakton Community College (No. 535)
 Parkland College (No. 505)
 Prairie State College (No. 515)
 Rend Lake College (No. 521)
 Richland Community College (No. 537)
 Rock Valley College (No. 511)
 Sauk Valley Community College (No. 506)
 Shawnee Community College (No. 531)
 South Suburban College (No. 510)
 Southeastern Illinois College (No. 533)
 Southwestern Illinois College (No. 522)
 Spoon River College (No. 534)
 Triton College (No. 504)
 Waubonsee Community College (No. 516)

Indiana 
 Ivy Tech Community College of Indiana (30 campuses statewide)

Iowa 

 Des Moines Area Community College
 Eastern Iowa Community Colleges
 Clinton Community College
 Muscatine Community College
 Scott Community College
 Hawkeye Community College
 Indian Hills Community College
 Iowa Central Community College
 Iowa Lakes Community College
 Iowa Valley Community College District
 Ellsworth Community College
 Iowa Valley Community College (Grinnell)
 Marshalltown Community College
 Iowa Western Community College
 Kirkwood Community College
 North Iowa Area Community College
 Northeast Iowa Community College
 Northwest Iowa Community College
 Southeastern Community College
 Southwestern Community College
 Western Iowa Tech Community College

Kansas 

 Allen Community College
 Barton Community College
 Butler Community College
 Cloud County Community College
 Coffeyville Community College
 Colby Community College
 Cowley College
 Dodge City Community College
 Donnelly College
 Fort Scott Community College
 Garden City Community College
 Highland Community College
 Hutchinson Community College
 Independence Community College
 Johnson County Community College
 Kansas City Kansas Community College
 Labette Community College
 Neosho County Community College
 Pratt Community College
 Seward County Community College

Kentucky 

 Ashland Community and Technical College
 Big Sandy Community and Technical College
 Bluegrass Community and Technical College
 Elizabethtown Community and Technical College
 Gateway Community and Technical College
 Hazard Community and Technical College
 Henderson Community College
 Hopkinsville Community College
 Jefferson Community and Technical College
 Madisonville Community College
 Maysville Community and Technical College
 Owensboro Community and Technical College
 Somerset Community College
 Southcentral Kentucky Community and Technical College
 Southeast Kentucky Community and Technical College
 West Kentucky Community and Technical College

Louisiana 

Baton Rouge Community College
Bossier Parish Community College
Central Louisiana Technical Community College
Delgado Community College
L.E. Fletcher Technical Community College
Louisiana Delta Community College
Louisiana Technical College
Northshore Technical Community College
Northwest Louisiana Technical College
Nunez Community College
River Parishes Community College
South Central Louisiana Technical College
South Louisiana Community College
Sowela Technical Community College

Maine 

 Central Maine Community College
 Eastern Maine Community College
 Kennebec Valley Community College
 Northern Maine Community College
 Southern Maine Community College
 Washington County Community College
 York County Community College

Maryland 

 Allegany College of Maryland
 Anne Arundel Community College
 Baltimore City Community College
 Carroll Community College
 Cecil College
 Chesapeake College
 College of Southern Maryland
 Community College of Baltimore County
 Frederick Community College
 Garrett College
 Hagerstown Community College
 Harford Community College
 Howard Community College
 Montgomery College
 Prince George's Community College
 Wor–Wic Community College

Massachusetts 

 Berkshire Community College
 Bristol Community College
 Bunker Hill Community College
 Cape Cod Community College
 Greenfield Community College
 Holyoke Community College
 Massachusetts Bay Community College
 Massasoit Community College
 Middlesex Community College
 Mount Wachusett Community College
 North Shore Community College
 Northern Essex Community College
 Quinsigamond Community College
 Roxbury Community College
 Springfield Technical Community College

Michigan 

 Alpena Community College
 Bay de Noc Community College
 Bay Mills Community College
 Delta College
 Glen Oaks Community College
 Gogebic Community College
 Grand Rapids Community College
 Henry Ford College
 Jackson College
 Kalamazoo Valley Community College
 Kellogg Community College
 Kirtland Community College
 Lake Michigan College
 Lansing Community College
 Macomb Community College
 Mid Michigan Community College
 Monroe County Community College
 Montcalm Community College
 Mott Community College
 Muskegon Community College
 North Central Michigan College
 Northwestern Michigan College
 Oakland Community College
 St. Clair County Community College
 Schoolcraft College
 Southwestern Michigan College
 Washtenaw Community College
 Wayne County Community College District
 West Shore Community College

Minnesota 

 Alexandria Technical and Community College
 Anoka-Ramsey Community College
 Anoka Technical College
 Central Lakes College
 Century College
 Dakota County Technical College
 Fond du Lac Tribal and Community College
 Hennepin Technical College
 Hibbing Community College
 Inver Hills Community College
 Itasca Community College
 Lake Superior College
 Mesabi Range College
 Minneapolis Community and Technical College
 Minnesota State College Southeast
 Minnesota State Community and Technical College
 Minnesota West Community and Technical College
 Normandale Community College
 North Hennepin Community College
 Northland Community & Technical College
 Pine Technical and Community College
 Rainy River Community College
 Red Lake Nation College
 Ridgewater College
 Riverland Community College
 Rochester Community and Technical College
 St. Cloud Technical and Community College
 Saint Paul College
 South Central College
 Vermilion Community College
 White Earth Tribal and Community College

Mississippi 

 Coahoma Community College
 Copiah–Lincoln Community College
 East Central Community College
 East Mississippi Community College
 Hinds Community College
 Holmes Community College
 Itawamba Community College
 Jones County Junior College
 Meridian Community College
 Mississippi Delta Community College
 Mississippi Gulf Coast Community College
 Northeast Mississippi Community College
 Northwest Mississippi Community College
 Pearl River Community College
 Southwest Mississippi Community College

Missouri 

 Crowder College
 East Central College
 Jefferson College
 Metropolitan Community College
 Mineral Area College
 Missouri State University–West Plains
 Moberly Area Community College
 North Central Missouri College
 Ozarks Technical Community College
 St. Charles Community College
 St. Louis Community College
 State Fair Community College
 State Technical College of Missouri
 Three Rivers College

Montana 

 Aaniiih Nakoda College
 Bitterroot College of the University of Montana
 Blackfeet Community College
 Chief Dull Knife College
 City College at Montana State University Billings
 Dawson Community College
 Flathead Valley Community College
 Fort Peck Community College
 Gallatin College Montana State University
 Great Falls College Montana State University
 Helena College University of Montana
 Little Big Horn College
 Miles Community College
 Missoula College University of Montana
 Montana Technological University
 Salish Kootenai College
 Stone Child College

Nebraska 

 Central Community College
 Metropolitan Community College
 Mid-Plains Community College
 Nebraska College of Technical Agriculture
 Nebraska Indian Community College
 Northeast Community College
 Southeast Community College
 Western Nebraska Community College

Nevada 
 College of Southern Nevada
 Truckee Meadows Community College
 Western Nevada College

New Hampshire 

 Great Bay Community College
 Lakes Region Community College
 Manchester Community College
 Nashua Community College
 NHTI – Concord's Community College
 River Valley Community College
 White Mountains Community College

New Jersey 

 Atlantic Cape Community College
 Bergen Community College
 Brookdale Community College
 Camden County College
 County College of Morris
 Essex County College
 Hudson County Community College
 Mercer County Community College
 Middlesex College
 Ocean County College
 Passaic County Community College
 Raritan Valley Community College
 Rowan College at Burlington County
 Rowan College of South Jersey
 Salem Community College
 Sussex County Community College
 Union College
 Warren County Community College

New Mexico 

 Central New Mexico Community College
 Clovis Community College
 Diné College
 Doña Ana Community College
 Luna Community College
 Mesalands Community College
 New Mexico Junior College
 New Mexico State University Alamogordo
 Northern New Mexico College
 San Juan College
 Santa Fe Community College
 Southwestern Indian Polytechnic Institute
 New Mexico Military Institute

New York 

 Borough of Manhattan Community College
 Bronx Community College
 Cayuga Community College
 Clinton Community College
 Columbia–Greene Community College
 Corning Community College
 Dutchess Community College
 Finger Lakes Community College
 Fulton–Montgomery Community College
 Genesee Community College
 Guttman Community College
 Herkimer County Community College
 Hostos Community College
 Hudson Valley Community College
 Jamestown Community College
 Jefferson Community College
 Kingsborough Community College
 LaGuardia Community College
 Mohawk Valley Community College
 Monroe Community College
 Nassau Community College
 Niagara County Community College
 North Country Community College
 Onondaga Community College
 Queensborough Community College
 Rockland Community College
 Schenectady County Community College
 Suffolk County Community College
 SUNY Adirondack
 SUNY Broome Community College
 SUNY Erie
 SUNY Orange
 SUNY Sullivan
 SUNY Ulster
 Tompkins Cortland Community College
 Westchester Community College

North Carolina 

 Alamance Community College
 Asheville–Buncombe Technical Community College
 Beaufort County Community College
 Bladen Community College
 Blue Ridge Community College
 Brunswick Community College
 Caldwell Community College & Technical Institute
 Cape Fear Community College
 Carteret Community College
 Catawba Valley Community College
 Central Carolina Community College
 Central Piedmont Community College
 Cleveland Community College
 Coastal Carolina Community College
 College of The Albemarle
 Craven Community College
 Davidson-Davie Community College
 Durham Technical Community College
 Edgecombe Community College
 Fayetteville Technical Community College
 Forsyth Technical Community College
 Gaston College

 Guilford Technical Community College
 Halifax Community College
 Haywood Community College
 Isothermal Community College
 James Sprunt Community College
 Johnston Community College
 Lenoir Community College
 Martin Community College
 Mayland Community College
 McDowell Technical Community College
 Mitchell Community College
 Montgomery Community College
 Nash Community College
 Pamlico Community College
 Piedmont Community College
 Pitt Community College
 Randolph Community College
 Richmond Community College
 Roanoke–Chowan Community College
 Robeson Community College
 Rockingham Community College
 Rowan–Cabarrus Community College
 Sampson Community College
 Sandhills Community College
 South Piedmont Community College
 Southeastern Community College
 Southwestern Community College
 Stanly Community College
 Surry Community College
 Tri-County Community College
 Vance–Granville Community College
 Wake Technical Community College
 Wayne Community College
 Western Piedmont Community College
 Wilkes Community College
 Wilson Community College

North Dakota 

 Bismarck State College
 Cankdeska Cikana Community College
 Dakota College at Bottineau
 Lake Region State College
 North Dakota State College of Science
 Nueta Hidatsa Sahnish College
 Sitting Bull College
 Turtle Mountain Community College
 United Tribes Technical College
 Williston State College

Northern Mariana Islands 
 Northern Marianas College

Ohio 

 Belmont College
 Central Ohio Technical College
 Cincinnati State Technical and Community College
 Clark State College
 Columbus State Community College
 Cuyahoga Community College
 Eastern Gateway Community College
 Edison State Community College
 Hocking College
 Lakeland Community College
 Lorain County Community College
 Marion Technical College
 North Central State College
 Northwest State Community College
 Owens Community College
 Rio Grande Community College
 Sinclair Community College
 Southern State Community College
 Stark State College
 Terra State Community College
 University of Cincinnati Clermont College
 Washington State Community College
 Zane State College

Oklahoma 

 Carl Albert State College
 Connors State College
 Eastern Oklahoma State College
 Murray State College
 Northeastern Oklahoma A&M College
 Northern Oklahoma College
 Oklahoma City Community College
 Redlands Community College
 Rose State College
 Seminole State College
 Tulsa Community College
 Western Oklahoma State College

Oregon 

 Blue Mountain Community College
 Central Oregon Community College
 Chemeketa Community College
 Clackamas Community College
 Clatsop Community College
 Columbia Gorge Community College
 Klamath Community College
 Lane Community College
 Linn–Benton Community College
 Mt. Hood Community College
 Oregon Coast Community College
 Portland Community College
 Rogue Community College
 Southwestern Oregon Community College
 Tillamook Bay Community College
 Treasure Valley Community College
 Umpqua Community College

Pennsylvania 

 Bucks County Community College
 Butler County Community College
 Community College of Allegheny County
 Community College of Beaver County
 Community College of Philadelphia
 Delaware County Community College
 Harrisburg Area Community College
 Lehigh Carbon Community College
 Luzerne County Community College
 Montgomery County Community College
 Northampton Community College
 Pennsylvania Highlands Community College
 Reading Area Community College
 Westmoreland County Community College

Puerto Rico 
 Instituto Comercial de Puerto Rico

Rhode Island 
 Community College of Rhode Island

South Carolina 

 Aiken Technical College
 Central Carolina Technical College
 Denmark Technical College
 Florence–Darlington Technical College
 Greenville Technical College
 Horry-Georgetown Technical College
 Midlands Technical College
 Northeastern Technical College
 Orangeburg–Calhoun Technical College
 Piedmont Technical College
 Spartanburg Community College
 Technical College of the Lowcountry
 Tri-County Technical College
 Trident Technical College
 Williamsburg Technical College
 York Technical College

South Dakota 

 Kilian Community College
 Lake Area Technical College
 Mitchell Technical Institute
 Oglala Lakota College
 Sisseton Wahpeton College
 Southeast Technical Institute
 Western Dakota Technical Institute

Tennessee 

 Chattanooga State Community College
 Cleveland State Community College
 Columbia State Community College
 Dyersburg State Community College
 Jackson State Community College
 Motlow State Community College
 Nashville State Community College
 Northeast State Community College
 Pellissippi State Community College
 Roane State Community College
 Southwest Tennessee Community College
 Volunteer State Community College
 Walters State Community College

Texas 

 Alamo Colleges District
 Northeast Lakeview College
 Northwest Vista College
 Palo Alto College
 St. Philip's College
 San Antonio College
 Alvin Community College
 Amarillo College
 Angelina College
 Austin Community College District
 Blinn College
 Brazosport College
 Central Texas College
 Cisco College
 Clarendon College
 Coastal Bend College
 College of the Mainland
 Collin College
 Dallas College
 Brookhaven Campus
 Cedar Valley Campus
 Eastfield Campus
 El Centro Campus
 Mountain View Campus
 North Lake Campus
 Richland Campus
 Del Mar College
 El Paso Community College
 Frank Phillips College
 Galveston College
 Grayson College
 Hill College
 Houston Community College
 Howard College
 Kilgore College
 Laredo College
 Lee College
 Lone Star College System
 Lone Star College–CyFair
 Lone Star College–Kingwood
 Lone Star College–Montgomery
 Lone Star College–North Harris
 Lone Star College–Tomball
 McLennan Community College
 Midland College
 Navarro College
 North Central Texas College
 Northeast Texas Community College
 Odessa College
 Panola College
 Paris Junior College
 Ranger College
 San Jacinto College
 South Plains College
 South Texas College
 Southwest Texas Junior College
 Tarrant County College
 Temple College
 Texarkana College
 Texas State Technical College
 Trinity Valley Community College
 Tyler Junior College
 University of Texas at Brownsville {defunct}
 Vernon College
 Victoria College
 Weatherford College
 Western Texas College
 Wharton County Junior College

Utah 

 Salt Lake Community College
 Snow College
 Utah State University Eastern

Vermont 

 Community College of Vermont
 Vermont Technical College

Virginia 

 Blue Ridge Community College
 Central Virginia Community College
 Dabney S. Lancaster Community College
 Danville Community College
 Eastern Shore Community College
 Germanna Community College
 J. Sargeant Reynolds Community College
 Brightpoint Community College
 Laurel Ridge Community College
 Mountain Empire Community College
 New River Community College
 Northern Virginia Community College
 Patrick & Henry Community College
 Paul D. Camp Community College
 Piedmont Virginia Community College
 Rappahannock Community College
 Southside Virginia Community College
 Southwest Virginia Community College
 Thomas Nelson Community College
 Tidewater Community College
 Virginia Highlands Community College
 Virginia Western Community College
 Wytheville Community College

Washington 

 Bates Technical College
 Bellevue College
 Bellingham Technical College
 Big Bend Community College
 Cascadia College
 Centralia College
 Clark College
 Clover Park Technical College
 Columbia Basin College
 Community Colleges of Spokane
 Spokane Community College
 Spokane Falls Community College
 Edmonds College
 Everett Community College
 Grays Harbor College
 Green River College
 Highline College
 Lake Washington Institute of Technology
 Lower Columbia College
 North Seattle College
 Olympic College
 Peninsula College
 Pierce College
 Renton Technical College
 Seattle Central College
 Seattle Colleges District
 Shoreline Community College
 Skagit Valley College
 South Puget Sound Community College
 South Seattle College
 Tacoma Community College
 Walla Walla Community College
 Wenatchee Valley College
 Whatcom Community College
 Yakima Valley College

West Virginia 

 Blue Ridge Community and Technical College
 BridgeValley Community and Technical College
 Eastern West Virginia Community and Technical College
 Mountwest Community and Technical College
 New River Community and Technical College
 Pierpont Community and Technical College
 Potomac State College of West Virginia University
 Southern West Virginia Community and Technical College
 West Virginia Northern Community College
 West Virginia University at Parkersburg

Wisconsin 

 College of Menominee Nation
 Lac Courte Oreilles Ojibwa Community College
 University of Wisconsin Colleges
 UW–Eau Claire – Barron County
 UW–Green Bay, Manitowoc Campus
 UW–Green Bay, Marinette Campus
 UW–Green Bay, Sheboygan Campus
 UW–Milwaukee at Washington County
 UW–Milwaukee at Waukesha
 UW–Oshkosh, Fond du Lac Campus
 UW–Oshkosh, Fox Cities Campus
 UW–Platteville Baraboo Sauk County
 UW–Platteville Richland
 UW–Stevens Point at Marshfield
 UW–Stevens Point at Wausau
 UW–Whitewater at Rock County
 Wisconsin Technical College System
 Blackhawk Technical College
 Chippewa Valley Technical College
 Fox Valley Technical College
 Gateway Technical College
 Lakeshore Technical College
 Madison Area Technical College
 Mid-State Technical College
 Milwaukee Area Technical College
 Moraine Park Technical College
 Nicolet Area Technical College
 Northcentral Technical College
 Northeast Wisconsin Technical College
 Southwest Wisconsin Technical College
 Waukesha County Technical College
 Western Technical College
 Wisconsin Indianhead Technical College

Wyoming 

 Casper College
 Central Wyoming College
 Eastern Wyoming College
 Laramie County Community College
 Northern Wyoming Community College District
 Gillette College
 Sheridan College
 Northwest College
 Western Wyoming Community College

References

Community Colleges
Community Colleges